The Joseph Sunde Memorial is a single day road cycling race held in Australia. The race exists of only a men's  race.

Past winners

References
 

Cycle races in Australia
Recurring sporting events established in 1994
Men's road bicycle races
1994 establishments in Australia